"Against the Odds" is the debut single by Danish singer Christopher released on EMI Denmark. It was co-written by Kay & Ndustry, Kasper Larsen, Ole Brodersen, Curtis Richa and Johan Wetterberg and produced by Kay & Ndustry and GL Music's Lasse Lindorff.

Chart performance
On 16 September 2011, the single was released reaching No. 23 on the Danish Singles Chart.

Music video
The accompanying music video was directed by Nicolas Tobias Følsgaard and Jonas Lodahl Andersen showing Christopher and his friends in an outing.

References

2011 songs
2011 debut singles
Christopher (singer) songs